Phineas Cook Dummer (October 28, 1797 – September 14, 1875) was the sixth mayor of Jersey City in New Jersey. He succeeded Peter Bentley, Sr. A Whig politician, he served four one-year terms from April 1844 to April 20, 1848. He was succeeded by Henry C. Taylor.

Biography
Born in New Haven, Connecticut in 1787, he served in the New York Militia during the War of 1812. Dummer married Eliza Dobbs Holt, daughter of New London, Connecticut newspaper editor Charles Holt, on September 21, 1821 and they moved to Jersey City in 1824.

Dummer joined his brother George Dummer's Jersey Glass Company on Washington Street between Essex Street and the Morris Canal in Paulus Hook (later became incorporated as Jersey City). He later obtained a patent for the manufacture of pressed glass by a process called "Dummer's scallop or coverplate." By 1840s the glass company was known as P.C. Dummer & Company and was selling glassware for home, decorative and commercial use. The company went out of business after the economic downturn following the Civil War.

After serving as mayor, Dummer served as Chief of the Fire Department in 1850.

After his company went out of business, Dummer was elected City Collector of Taxes, and afterwards appointed Deputy collector of customs of the Port of New York, by Abraham Lincoln and re-appointed under Ulysses S. Grant. He held the position until his death on September 14, 1875 in Jersey City, New Jersey.

See also
 List of mayors of Jersey City, New Jersey

References

External links
 Jersey City: Past and Present

1787 births
1875 deaths
Politicians from New Haven, Connecticut
American militiamen in the War of 1812
Glass makers
New Jersey Whigs
19th-century American politicians
Mayors of Jersey City, New Jersey